The Nursemaid Who Disappeared is a 1939 British, black-and-white, crime film, directed by Arthur B. Woods and starring Ronald Shiner as Detective Smith (uncredited), Ian Fleming, Arthur Margetson, Peter Coke and Edward Chapman. Based on a 1938 Philip Macdonald novel, it was produced by Warner Brothers - First National Productions. The 1956 American 20th Century-Fox film, 23 Paces to Baker Street, was based on the same novel.

Plot
In this thriller, a playwright overhears a gang of men plotting a kidnapping and enlists the assistance of a detective to investigate them. They soon find the ring is fronted by a bogus employment agency that sends "clients" to check out potential victims. Action ensues as they endeavor to stop them.

Cast
 Arthur Margetson as Det. Antony Gethryn
 Peter Coke as Tom Sheldon
 Lesley Brook as Avis Bellingham
 Edward Chapman as Jenks
 Coral Browne as Mabel Barnes
 Joyce Kennedy as Lucia Gethryn
 Dorice Fordred as Janet Murch
 Martita Hunt as Lady Ballister
 Marion Gerth as Ada Brent
 Ian McLean as Inspector Pike
 Ian Fleming as Sir Egbert Lucas
 Eliot Makeham as Mr. Hines
 Ronald Shiner as Detective Smith (uncredited)

References

External links
 
 
 

1939 films
1939 crime films
British black-and-white films
1930s English-language films
Films directed by Arthur B. Woods
British crime films
Films based on British novels
1930s British films